Matthew David Butcher (born 14 May 1997) is an English professional footballer who plays as a midfielder for Plymouth Argyle F.C.

Club career

AFC Bournemouth
Since joining AFC Bournemouth in 2010 at the age of thirteen, Butcher has continued to surge through the under-18 and under-21 sides. On 1 April 2015, he and three other Bournemouth youth prospects (including Joe Quigley, Jordan Lee and Jack Simpson) were offered a one-year professional contract.

On 27 August 2015, Butcher made his Bournemouth debut featuring in a 4–0 victory over Hartlepool United in the League Cup, replacing Adam Smith in the 77th minute. On 9 January 2016, he went on to make his first Bournemouth start in a 2–1 victory over Birmingham City in the FA Cup, playing the full 90 minutes.

Non-league loan spells
On 5 February 2015, Butcher joined Conference South side Gosport Borough on a one-month loan on a work experience basis. 2 days later, he made his Gosport Borough debut in a 2–1 defeat against Hemel Hempstead Town, playing the full 90 minutes. On 7 March 2015, after only making one appearance for Gosport Borough, Butcher returned to Bournemouth.

On 26 March 2015, he joined non-league side Poole Town on loan for the remainder of the season. On 4 April 2015, Butcher made his Poole Town debut in a 1–0 defeat to Chippenham Town, playing the full 90 minutes. He went on to make seven more appearances before returning to Bournemouth.

On 26 February 2016, Butcher joined National League side Woking on a one-month loan deal. On 27 February 2016, he made his Woking debut in a 2–0 defeat to Grimsby Town in the FA Trophy, playing the full 90 minutes. On 26 March 2016, after impressing on loan at Woking, Butcher's loan spell was extended until the end of the season. On 2 April 2016, Butcher scored his first professional goal in a 2–2 draw with Southport, in which he got both goals.

Yeovil Town (loan)
On 5 August 2016, Butcher joined League Two side Yeovil Town on a six-month loan deal. The following day, Butcher made his Yeovil Town debut in a 2–0 home victory against Notts County, replacing Kevin Dawson with six minutes remaining. On 9 August 2016, Butcher was given his full Yeovil Town debut by manager Darren Way in a 2–0 away victory against Walsall in the EFL Cup first round. On 5 January 2017, Butcher and his fellow Bournemouth loanee Ben Whitfield's loans were extended until the end of the season.

St Johnstone (loan)
Butcher signed on for Scottish Premiership club St Johnstone on a six-month loan on 31 January 2020.

Accrington Stanley
On 24 August 2020, Butcher signed for Accrington Stanley on a two-year deal.

On 5 May 2022, Accrington Stanley announced Butcher would be leaving the club upon the expiration of his contract on 30 June 2022, with Stanley unable to agree improved terms with the player.

Plymouth Argyle
On 20 June 2022, Plymouth Argyle announced on their website that Butcher would join on a two-year contract.

Career statistics

References

1997 births
Living people
sportspeople from Reading, Berkshire
English footballers
Association football midfielders
AFC Bournemouth players
Gosport Borough F.C. players
Poole Town F.C. players
Woking F.C. players
Yeovil Town F.C. players
St Johnstone F.C. players
Accrington Stanley F.C. players
Plymouth Argyle F.C. players
English Football League players
Scottish Professional Football League players
National League (English football) players
Southern Football League players